Miss Spain Universe 2014 was the second edition of the Miss Universe Spain beauty pageant. It was held on October 28, 2014, at the Teatro Bodevil in the city of Madrid. Patricia Yurena Rodríguez, Miss Spain Universe 2013, crowned the winner Desirée Cordero Ferrer as her successor who represented Spain in the Miss Universe 2014.

Results

Placements

Candidates 
14 candidates will compete in the contest:

Development of the event 
It was to take place on August 23, 2014, at La Cantera de Nagüeles in Marbella, as part of the Starlite Festival, 4 but was canceled a few days before being held for organizational reasons.

References 

Miss Spain
2014 in Spain
2014 beauty pageants